Terry Fahey (born 20 January 1954) is an Australian former professional rugby league footballer who played for the South Sydney Rabbitohs, Eastern Suburbs Roosters and Canberra Raiders clubs. He was a powerful, hard-running .

Background
Fahey was born in Wellington, New South Wales, Australia.

Playing career
Nicknamed the "Redfern Express", Fahey started his football career in the New South Wales country, playing in Western Division's win in the 1974 Amco Cup final over Penrith. In 1975, he was selected to represent Country against City. He was also selected to play for Australia in the 1975 World Championship series. His is listed on the Australian Players Register
as Kangaroo No. 481.
He left his club Wellington to move to the Sydney competition in 1975 to play for Souths. He went on to play 90 first grade matches for the Rabbitohs in the years 1976-1980 scoring 46 tries and 28 goals for a total of 194 points. In 1981 he joined Easts where he would stay for two seasons. He was the season's leading try scorer in 1981 with fifteen tries. Fahey signed with Canberra in 1983 but damaged bone in his neck caused him to sit out the entire 1985 season. He was playing again in 1986 and remained with the Raiders until the end of the 1987 season, when he retired.

Fahey played three tests for Australia between 1975 and 1981 (scoring three tries) and a total of eight internationals. He also played eight games for New South Wales, two being State of Origin matches in 1981 and 1982.

Post playing
Fahey was named on the wing in the NRL's Team of the 1970s when it was announced in 2005.

He became involved in breeding and training greyhounds and has since moved on to racehorse training.

Footnotes

Sources
 

1954 births
Living people
Australia national rugby league team players
Australian rugby league players
Canberra Raiders players
Country New South Wales Origin rugby league team players
New South Wales Rugby League State of Origin players
Rugby league wingers
South Sydney Rabbitohs players
Sydney Roosters players
South Sydney Rabbitohs captains